Lapeyrère is a commune in the Haute-Garonne department in southwestern France.

Geography
The commune is bordered by six other communes, three of them is in Haute-Garonne, and three in Ariège: Bax to the north, Canens to thr northeast, Latour to the west, and finally by the department of Ariège to the east, southeast, and south by the communes of Sainte-Suzanne, Sieuras, and Méras.

Population

See also
Communes of the Haute-Garonne department

References

Communes of Haute-Garonne